Genovevo Morejón (born 3 January 1954) is a Cuban former track and field athlete who competed in the hammer throw. His greatest honour was the gold medal at the Pan American Games in 1983, becoming the first Caribbean man to win that title.

He also won minor medals at Pan American and Central American and Caribbean level, as well as a silver at the 1983 Ibero-American Championships in Athletics.

International competitions

References

Living people
1954 births
Cuban male hammer throwers
Pan American Games gold medalists for Cuba
Pan American Games bronze medalists for Cuba
Athletes (track and field) at the 1979 Pan American Games
Athletes (track and field) at the 1983 Pan American Games
Pan American Games medalists in athletics (track and field)
Central American and Caribbean Games gold medalists for Cuba
Competitors at the 1974 Central American and Caribbean Games
Competitors at the 1978 Central American and Caribbean Games
Competitors at the 1982 Central American and Caribbean Games
Central American and Caribbean Games medalists in athletics
Medalists at the 1979 Pan American Games
Medalists at the 1983 Pan American Games
20th-century Cuban people